Kodeljevo Hall is a multi-purpose indoor arena located in Ljubljana, Slovenia with a seating capacity of 1,540. It is mostly used for basketball and handball matches as the home ground of KD Slovan and RD Slovan, respectively.

References 

Sports venues in Ljubljana
Indoor arenas in Slovenia
Sports venues completed in 1970
20th-century architecture in Slovenia